PASL may refer to:

 Professional Arena Soccer League (PASL-Pro), now the MASL
 Premier Arena Soccer League
 Pro-Active South London (P-ASL) 
 Sleetmute Airport (ICAO location indicator: PASL), in Sleetmute, Alaska, United States